"Life" is a song by American R&B duo K-Ci & JoJo. It was the first single off their second studio album It's Real. It is also featured on the soundtrack for the 1999 movie Life. The lyrics were written by R&B singer & producer R. Kelly.

The lyrics can be interpreted in many different ways, but it mainly tells a narrative about being imprisoned for life.

Weekly charts

References 

1998 songs
1999 singles
K-Ci & JoJo songs
Songs written by R. Kelly
Song recordings produced by R. Kelly
MCA Records singles